The 2016–17 season was Sepahan's 16th season in the Pro League, and their 23rd consecutive season in the top division of Iranian Football and 63rd year in existence as a football club. They competed in the Hazfi Cup. Sepahan was captained by Hossein Papi.

Players

First-team squad

 [U21 = Under 21 year player | U23 = Under 23 year player| U25 = Under 25 year player]

Current managerial staff

Matches

Pro league

League table

Results summary

Results by round

References

External links
  Club Official Website
  The Club page in Soccerway.com
  The Club page in Persianleague.com

 
Sepahan